David J. Gower is a palaeontologist.

Before making his debut for the Strongroom CC in 2000, he was a herpetology researcher at the Museum of Natural History in London.

See also

:Category:Taxa named by David J. Gower

References

External links  
 David Gower's Homepage at www.bmnh.org
http://www.strongroomcc.com/profile.asp?pid=3

English palaeontologists
Living people
Year of birth missing (living people)